Hamza Hadda (born 18 April 1991) is a retired Tunisian football midfielder plays for AS Marsa as a midfielder.

References

1991 births
Living people
Tunisian footballers
Tunisian expatriate footballers
Espérance Sportive de Tunis players
Stade Gabèsien players
CS Sfaxien players
US Monastir (football) players
Stade Tunisien players
Al-Nairyah Club players
AS Marsa players
Association football midfielders
Tunisian Ligue Professionnelle 1 players
Saudi Second Division players
Expatriate footballers in Saudi Arabia
Tunisian expatriate sportspeople in Saudi Arabia

Footballers from Tunis